Neil Faulkner (born 1962) is a British realist painter. He lives and works in the United Kingdom, and exhibits his paintings at many galleries throughout the UK and Ireland.The majority of Faulkner's paintings are watercolours, although he also produces oil paintings. His watercolours fall into the categories figurative and still life. He is best known for his rustic still life paintings.

Typical subjects of Neil’s paintings are flowers, fruit, furniture, pottery, crockery and diverse everyday objects. The exploration of light and shade is central to Faulkner’s art. In his paintings light flows through windows and doors and falls on objects, endowing them with vibrancy and vividness of colour.

As a young man, Faulkner got acquainted with the works of the American realist painter Andrew Wyeth at the Royal Academy of Arts in London. Since then Wyeth has been a constant inspiration to Faulkner, and he has travelled to the United States to see more paintings by Wyeth.

For many years Neil has worked for Royal Doulton, an English tableware company, producing designs and paintings for their porcelain. Faulkner was responsible for the artwork commemorating the 100th birthday of Elizabeth the Queen Mother.

References
Oakham Galleries: biography
Art in a Click:biography
Global Gallery: biography and paintings
Priory Gallery Broadway: biography and paintings

External links
Neil Faulkner at Callaghan Fine Paintings
Neil Faulkner at Oakham Galleries
The exhibition Recent Paintings by Neil Faulkner and James Longueville at Oakham Galleries
Neil Faulkner at Sarah Samuels Fine Paintings
Neil Faulkner at Art in a Click
Neil Faulkner at ArtSeek.com
Neil Faulkner at LeMaze Studio
Neil Faulkner at AllPosters.com
Neil Faulkner at Poster Check Out
Neil Faulkner at Art.com
Neil Faulkner at New England Art Express
Neil Faulkner at Printfinders.com

1962 births
20th-century British painters
British male painters
21st-century British painters
Living people
Porcelain painters
Realist painters
20th-century British male artists
21st-century British male artists